The Conference of Montreal is an annual economic event organized by the International Economic Forum of the Americas (IEFA) since 1995.

Mission
The Conference of Montreal is a not-for-profit organization engaged to heightening knowledge and awareness of the issues concerning economic globalization, with a particular emphasis on the relations between the Americas and other continents.

The Conference works to foster exchanges of information and to promote free discussion on major current economic issues. It also facilitates meetings between world leaders to encourage international discourse by bringing together heads of state, the private sector, international organizations and civil society.

The Conference brings together 200 speakers and more than 4,200 people from across the globe every year.

History
The Conference of Montreal was founded in 1995, by Gil Rémillard, at a time when the globalization of the economies was beginning to emerge at an increased rate.

With the fall of communism, the success of the "Uruguay round" in 1989, the creation of the World Trade Organization (WTO) in 1994 and the beginnings of North American Free Trade Agreement (NAFTA), the world was ready to construct a global market that would benefit to every countries. A desire emerged to create an independent international forum in Montreal, to identify and discuss the impact of all these developments on the global economic system. A first conference was organized on June 20–22, 1995.

The IEFA now hosts four annual events: the Conference of Montreal, the Toronto Global Forum (founded in 2007), the World Strategic Forum, held in Miami (founded in 2011), as well as the Conference of Paris (founded in 2017).

In June 2018, the Conference of Montreal will celebrate its 25th Anniversary edition under the theme "Embracing Change", and will reiterate its position among the most important international economic forums, connecting world leaders for twenty-five years.

Notable Speakers

Board of Governors

Chair
Paul Desmarais, Jr., Chairman and Co-Chief Executive Officer, Power Corporation of Canada (PCC)

Founding Chairman
Gil Rémillard

Governors
Current members of the board of governors of the Conference of Montreal are:

Secretary
Duarte M. Miranda

See also
International Economic Forum of the Americas
Toronto Global Forum
World Strategic Forum
The Conference of Paris

References

External links
 International Economic Forum of the Americas
 Conference of Montreal
 Toronto Global Forum
 World Strategic Forum
The Conference of Paris

Annual events in Canada
International conferences in Canada
Business conferences
Global economic conferences